Well Done Abba is a 2010 Indian political satire Hindi film directed by Shyam Benegal, starring Boman Irani, Minissha Lamba and Sameer Dattani in pivotal roles. It is the remake of the 2007 Marathi film, Jau Tithe Khau. It was based on three short stories: Narsaiyyan Ki Bavdi by Jeelani Bano, Phulwa Ka Pul by Sanjeev and Still Waters by Jayant Kripalani. The screenplay was written by Jayant Kripalani and Ashok Mishra, who also wrote the dialogues. It won the 2009 National Film Award for Best Film on Social Issues.

Plot
The film tells the story of Armaan Ali (Boman Irani), a Muslim driver working in Mumbai, who takes a one-month leave from his employer to find a groom for his daughter Muskaan (Minissha Lamba), who lives in a village near Hyderabad, India. Armaan does not turn up for three months, and his employer makes the difficult decision to sack him, but he asks his boss to listen to why he could not come. Getting soft, his employer allows him to drive to Pune where he has a meeting. Armaan starts the story from here.

In Armaan's village, many problems include a rising drought situation and financial difficulties due to the antics of his twin brother, who has a bad reputation for debt addiction and theft. In the opening, a man named Arif demands 500 rupees from Armaan. Eventually, Muskaan pays the debt to Arif and Armaan's brother is arrested, later on released. To solve the drought problem, he goes to a government office to build a well, with a friend. There, he goes through stages such as explaining what he wants and even having his photo taken. Muskaan, on the other hand falls in love with Arif, of which Armaan does not approve at first but later is pleased with.

Armaan does not receive the well he wanted and sits in despair. He and Muskaan try to tell the police inspector about the well that was 'stolen', but the inspector finds the story rather silly and is even stubborn enough to not listen to what they have to say. Disturbed, Armaan and Muskaan launch a protest with several villagers against the police inspector, later on to the justice minister, where the minister punishes the inspector for his slack behaviour. The inspector, realising his mistakes and behaviour, then starts to approach the people in a more orthodox way. The justice minister then allows the government people to build the well for the villagers and punishes them all, for not doing what they are supposed to do.

With the drought problem solved, Armaan decides that Muskaan should marry an Arab sheikh. Muskaan does not accept her father's offer and even has an argument about this. The issue is even more heated when she receives a letter from her friend, Sakina, which involved her getting beat up by her sheikh husband and getting kicked out, shocking Armaan and Sakina's mother. Disturbed, Armaan then decides that Muskaan should marry Arif, much to her delight. With the two of Armaan's problems solved, he ends his story at an awards ceremony, which in his perspective was a 'big drama', as the stage literally collapsed, delighting people. With his employer convinced, he then allows Armaan to work for him again.

Cast
 Boman Irani as Armaan Ali / Rehman Ali (Twin Brothers)
 Minissha Lamba as Muskaan Ali
 Rahul Singh as Rohan Kapoor (Arman Ali's boss)
 Sammir Dattani as Arif Ali
 Ravi Kishan as Sub Engineer Vikas Jha
 Ila Arun as Salma Ali
 Salim Ghouse as Janardhan Reddy
 Sonali Kulkarni as Malti Jha (Vikas Jha's wife)
 Rajit Kapur as Inspector Srikant Reddy
 Akhil Mishra as Arun Mishra - Tahsildar
 Yashpal Sharma as Constable Ramiyya
 Ravi Jhankal as Constable Rustam
 Deepika Amin as Lata (Inspector's wife)
 Rajendra Gupta as Irrigation Minister
 Anaitha Nair as Sakina
 Preeti Nigam as Sakina's mother

Production
BIG Pictures and Reliance BIG Entertainment Ltd collaborated with director Shyam Benegal to bring "a satirical comedy 'Well Done Abba' on the celluloid". The film was shot at Film City, Mumbai, the Mumbai–Pune Expressway, Ramoji Film City and Ibrahimpatnam near Hyderabad.

Vihir Chorila Geli, a Marathi film, in based on similar story starring Laxmikant Berde and Ashok Saraf.

Soundtrack

Well Done Abba'''s music is by Shantanu Moitra and the main promotional song "Jab Bhi Muh Kholta" was composed by Vishal Khurana. The lyrics are penned by Ashok Mishra, Swanand Kirkire and Ila Arun.Music Review  NDTV.

Critical reception
The film received favourable reviews from top critics in India. It received 6.5/10 at ReviewGang. Anupama Chopra of NDTV writes "The end result is that Well Done Abba is heart-felt and intermittently funny", while Nikhat Khazmi of the Times of India writes "The film is a sheer delight, with the events unfolding in a breezy, comic vein which keeps the ribs relentlessly tickling".  Vinayak Chakravorty of Mail Today'' gave it three stars.

References

External links
 

2009 films
2000s Hindi-language films
Hindi remakes of Marathi films
Films directed by Shyam Benegal
2009 comedy films
Indian satirical films
Indian political satire films
Films set in Hyderabad, India
Films about corruption in India
Best Film on Other Social Issues National Film Award winners
Reliance Entertainment films
Films based on short fiction